Chapel House, Hereford Road, Monmouth, Wales, is a Georgian townhouse, built in the early eighteenth century, described by the architectural historian John Newman, as "the best house in the entire street". The house was designated a Grade II* listed building on 27 June 1952. Chapel House is now a boarding house of Monmouth School.

History
The house, originally called The Chantry, then St Brides, is substantially of the early eighteenth century. It has been credited as replacing another building on the same site, although no evidence of this has been found. It was built or improved by the ironmaster William Rea, a former Mayor of Monmouth, around 1720. The windows were replaced and a new entrance doorway was added around 1800, probably by ironmaster David Tanner. Chapel House was restored in 1910 by Humphrey Farran Hall who repaired the panelling. When it was reroofed in the later twentieth century, the large chimney stacks were removed. The name changed from St Brides in the late 1970s when Chapel House, a boarding house of Monmouth School for Boys, relocated from St James's Street.

Description
The building is of "seven bays under a hipped roof." It gives the appearance of being two buildings back to back, like several other houses in Monmouth. Curiously, the garden range is larger than the street range. The red-brick walls to the side, which give access to a service court, and the garden stretching down to the River Monnow are "contemporary", the garden representing a "rare substantial townhouse garden from the early 18th century". It is registered at Grade II on the Register of Parks and Gardens of Special Historic Interest in Wales. The interior contains plasterwork and a staircase which "echo Troy House and Great Castle House", although John Newman considers that the quality of the interior fittings surpasses those of either.

References

Sources
 
 

Grade II* listed buildings in Monmouthshire
Houses in Monmouth, Wales
Houses completed in 1752
Registered historic parks and gardens in Monmouthshire